Đukan Đukanović (born October 31, 1992) is a Serbian professional basketball player for Kumanovo of the Macedonian First League.

Playing career 
Đukanović started his playing career with his hometown team Metalac. He also played for Kolín (Czech Republic) and Hopsi Polzela (Slovenia). In 2016, he came bach to Metalac. He was selected the Serbian First League MVP in the 2017–18 season.

On February 27, 2019, Đukanović signed for Força Lleida of the Spanish LEB Oro. He averaged 2.6 points, 1.6 rebounds and 2.1 assists per game. 

On September 10, 2020, Đukanović signed with Čelik of the Bosnian Championship. On July 3, 2021, he signed with Kumanovo of the Macedonian First League.

References

External links
 Player Profile at eurobasket.com
 Player Profile at realgm.com

1992 births
Living people
Basketball League of Serbia players
BC Kolín players
Força Lleida CE players
KK Metalac Valjevo players
KK Pirot players
Point guards
Serbian men's basketball players
Sportspeople from Valjevo
Serbian expatriate basketball people in Bosnia and Herzegovina
Serbian expatriate basketball people in the Czech Republic
Serbian expatriate basketball people in Slovenia
Serbian expatriate basketball people in Spain
Serbian expatriate basketball people in North Macedonia